Tomasz Brożyna (born 19 September 1970 in Bieliny) is a Polish former professional road racing cyclist, who currently works as a directeur sportif for UCI Continental team . He entered professional cycling in 1996 and retired in 2006 at the age of 36. He is the first Polish cyclist to complete all three of the Grand Tours.

Brożyna was a member of the Korona Kielce (1986–1995), Rotan Spiessens (1995),  (1996–1997),  (1998–1999, 2004, and 2006),  (2000–2002),  (2003), and Knauf teams (2005).

His son Piotr Brożyna is also a professional cyclist.

Major results

1990
 1st Stage 5a (ITT) Tour de Pologne
1991
 1st Overall Course de Solidarność et des Champions Olympiques
1992
 3rd Overall Peace Race
1993
 3rd Overall Course de Solidarność et des Champions Olympiques
 5th Overall Peace Race
1994
 1st  Team time trial, National Road Championships
 3rd Overall Tour de Pologne
 4th Overall Regio-Tour
1995
 1st Overall Tour of Małopolska
 3rd Overall Peace Race
1996
 National Road Championships
1st  Two-man time trial
2nd Individual time trial
 1st Overall Course de Solidarność et des Champions Olympiques
1998
 1st  Road race, National Road Championships
 1st Overall Course de Solidarność et des Champions Olympiques
 6th Route Adélie de Vitré
1999
 1st Overall Tour de Pologne
 1st Overall Course de Solidarność et des Champions Olympiques
1st Stages 2 & 3 (ITT)
 1st Overall Tour of Małopolska
 2nd Tatra Cup
 3rd Overall Peace Race
1st Stage 9
2000
 1st Overall Route du Sud
2002
 1st Stage 1 (TTT) Volta a Portugal
 2nd Overall Tour de Pologne
 7th Overall GP Mitsubishi
1st Stage 3 (TTT)
2003
 4th Overall Course de Solidarność et des Champions Olympiques
1st Stage 3
2004
 1st Overall Tour de Beauce
1st Stage 2
 3rd Overall Bayern–Rundfahrt
 7th Overall Tour de Pologne
2006
 2nd Overall Tour de Luxembourg

References

External links

Profile of Tomasz Brożyna (POL), world-of-cycling.com

1970 births
Living people
Polish male cyclists
Cyclists at the 1996 Summer Olympics
Cyclists at the 2004 Summer Olympics
Olympic cyclists of Poland
People from Kielce County
Sportspeople from Świętokrzyskie Voivodeship